
Lock and Dam No. 18 is a lock and dam located near Gladstone, Illinois and Burlington, Iowa on the Upper Mississippi River around river mile 410.5. In 2004, the facility was listed in the National Register of Historic Places as Lock and Dam No. 18 Historic District, #04000178 covering  , 1 building, 4 structures and 4 objects.

Hydroelectric plant
In March 2009, local officials started discussing plans to install a hydroelectric generating plant on the dam.

See also 
 Public Works Administration dams list

References

External links

Lock and Dam No. 18 - U.S. Army Corps of Engineers

Dams on the Mississippi River
Mississippi River locks
Dams in Illinois
Dams in Iowa
Gravity dams
Roller dams
Buildings and structures in Des Moines County, Iowa
Buildings and structures in Henderson County, Illinois
Dams completed in 1937
18
18
18
Transportation buildings and structures in Des Moines County, Iowa
Transport infrastructure completed in 1937
Historic districts on the National Register of Historic Places in Illinois
Historic American Engineering Record in Illinois
Historic American Engineering Record in Iowa
Mississippi Valley Division
National Register of Historic Places in Henderson County, Illinois
18
Public Works Administration in Iowa
Public Works Administration in Illinois